Amanda Randolph Hearst (born January 5, 1984), sometimes called Amanda Hearst Rønning, is an American socialite, activist, fashion model, and heiress to the Hearst Corporation, William Randolph Hearst's media conglomerate. Hearst previously worked as an associate market editor at Marie Claire and is the founder of Friends of Finn, an organization dedicated to stopping the inhumane treatment of dogs in puppy mills. She also served as a co-chair of Riverkeeper's Junior Council. Hearst co-founded Maison de Mode in 2015, an ethical luxury fashion online retailer. In 2018, Hearst co-founded the charity Well Beings, focusing on animal welfare, conservation and other humane initiatives.

Family and early life
Amanda Hearst is the daughter of Anne Hearst, the niece of Patty Hearst, and a great-granddaughter of media mogul William Randolph Hearst. Her father, Richard McChesney, separated from her mother before Hearst's birth. She is also the stepdaughter of novelist Jay McInerney and a cousin of Lydia Hearst-Shaw.

Hearst attended the Chapin School in New York City and graduated from Choate Rosemary Hall, a boarding school. After a brief stint at Boston College, she dropped out to pursue modelling. She was eventually persuaded to return to school, and she attended Fordham University, graduating in 2008 with a B.A. in art history.

Personal life
Amanda married Joachim Rønning on August 2, 2019. She lives in Los Angeles, where the couple owns a house together. On June 6, 2022, she gave birth to their first child, a son named Haakon "Hawk".

Modeling
As a former IMG model, Hearst has appeared on the covers of Town & Country, International Harper’s Bazaar, Cosmopolitan, and other major magazines, and has been featured in Vanity Fair.

References

External links

1984 births
Female models from New York (state)
American socialites
Amanda
Living people
Choate Rosemary Hall alumni
Boston College alumni
Fordham University alumni
Activists from New York (state)
American editors
American women editors
Founders of charities
Nonprofit businesspeople
Chapin School (Manhattan) alumni